Craig Tanner may refer to:

 Craig Tanner (producer) (born 1974), American film director, film producer and editor
 Craig Tanner (footballer) (born 1994), English footballer